Abed Hamdani Stadium is a multi-use stadium in El Khroub, Algeria.  It is currently used mostly for football matches and is the home ground of Algerian Ligue Professionnelle 2 side AS Khroub.  The stadium has an official capacity of 10,000 people.

External links
Stade Abed 

Abed Hamdani
Abed Hamdani